Solar power in South Carolina is rapidly becoming competitive with grid electricity, due to the decrease in cost and the eight-year extension to the 30% federal tax credit, which can be used to install any size system. South Carolina offers a 25% tax credit, meaning that 55% of the cost is covered through tax credits.

South Carolina's largest solar installation was the 311 kW Grand Strand Solar Station array in Myrtle Beach, completed on April 18, 2011, until December 2, 2011, when Boeing completed covering the roof of their 787 assembly building with a 2.6 MW solar array, sufficient for 20% of the building's energy use.

Source: NREL

See also
Solar power in the United States
Renewable energy in the United States

References

External links
 Open PV Project Database
 Renewable energy map
 Renewable energy policies and incentives

Energy in South Carolina
South Carolina